The Family Book is a 2003 children's book written by Todd Parr that details the daily lives of all kinds of families.

Controversy 
The book has been praised for its diversity in Parr's representation of different family units such as same sex families, and was placed on the summer reading list for the District of Columbia Public School system. The Family Book, along with several other LGBT-themed books, was removed from the Erie, Illinois school system after some parents complained about the book's depiction of same sex couples within the book.

In 2020, the book landed the 67th spot on the American Library Association's list of the most banned and challenged books in the United States from 2010 to 2019.

Reception 
The book won a 2004 Oppenheim Toy Portfolio Gold Award.

References

2003 children's books
American picture books
Children's books with LGBT themes
Books about families